Blanquillo is a village in the Durazno Department of central Uruguay.

Geography
The railroad track that joins Florida with La Paloma pass through the town.

History
On 17 November 1964, its status was elevated to "Pueblo" (village) by the Act of Ley Nº 13.299.

Population
In 2011, it had a population of 1,084.
 
Source: Instituto Nacional de Estadística de Uruguay

References

External links
INE map of Blanquillo

Populated places in the Durazno Department